Sixty Six is a 2006 British biographical comedy-drama film about a bar mitzvah which takes place in London on the day of the 1966 FIFA World Cup Final, based on the true life bar mitzvah of director Paul Weiland.

Plot 
Bernie Reubens, a young Jewish boy, is about to have his bar mitzvah. Initially, he meticulously plans a lavish reception to upstage that of his older brother Alvie, but as the family's finances lurch from one disaster to another, the family is forced to lower Bernie's expectations and stage the bar mitzvah reception at home in North London. When England reaches the 1966 FIFA World Cup Final, held on the same day, most of the guests make excuses not to come to the reception so that they can watch the game. In the end, Bernie's father saves the day by driving Bernie to Wembley Stadium to witness the end of the match.

Cast 
 Gregg Sulkin as Bernie Reubens
 Helena Bonham Carter as Esther Reubens
 Eddie Marsan as Immanuel "Manny" Reubens
 Ben Newton as Alvie Reubens
 Elliot Cukier as Young Alvie Reubens (uncredited)
 Thomas Drewson as Terry Shivers
 Peter Serafinowicz as Uncle Jimmy / Mr. Reubens, Sr. / Football Commentator
 Stephen Grief as Uncle Henry
 Catherine Tate as Aunt Lila
 Stephen Rea as Dr. Barrie
 Geraldine Somerville as Alice Barrie
 Maria Charles as Mrs Glitzman
 Vincenzo Nicoli as Leo
 Maximilian Law as Narrator (uncredited)

Reception 
On Rotten Tomatoes, the film has a rating of 65%, based on 52 reviews, with an average rating of 6.00/10. The site's critical consensus reads, "Likable but overly sentimental, Sixty Six has snatches of sharp dialogue but is ultimately too predicable." On Metacritic, the film holds a score of 57 out of 100, based on reviews from 11 critics, indicating "mixed or average reviews".

The Hollywood Reporter praised the film, saying "Although the subject might sound specialized, the picture is engineered with such skill that it transcends the ethnic details to become a universal story of a boy trying to find his place in an inhospitable world." Roger Ebert of the Chicago Sun-Times reviewed the film as being "enlightened by Bernie's impassioned narration and by a gallery of small comic details." The New York Times described the film as "A dolorous comedy that leans heavily, if inoffensively, on ethnic stereotypes."

References

External links
   Sixty Six at BFI
   Sixty Six at British Council–Film
   Sixty Six at Lumiere
 
 

2006 films
2006 comedy-drama films
British comedy-drama films
Films about Jews and Judaism
Films set in 1966
Films set in London
Films shot at Pinewood Studios
Films produced by Elizabeth Karlsen
Films produced by Eric Fellner
Films produced by Tim Bevan
Films shot at Elstree Film Studios
Number 9 Films films
StudioCanal films
Working Title Films films
Films directed by Paul Weiland
1966 FIFA World Cup
Films about the FIFA World Cup
British association football films
British coming-of-age comedy-drama films
England national football team
2000s English-language films
2000s British films